Forkhead-associated domain containing protein 1 (FHAD1) is a protein encoded by the FHAD1 gene.

As the name suggests, it has a forkhead-associated domain and an extensive coiled coil structure. It is predicted to have a function related to DNA transcription. It is localized to the nucleus and has a nuclear localization signal.

Gene

Locus and Size 
In humans, the FHAD1 gene is located on chromosome 1 (1p36.21) and the genomic sequence is on the plus strand starting from 15236559 bp and ending at 15400283 bp.  There are 3 main genes around FHAD1, out of which 2 encode proteins with known functions. Two genes, EFHD2 and Chymotrypsin-C (CTRC) lie downstream of FHAD1 on the plus strand. TMEM51 lies upstream of FHAD1.

FHAD1 is 163,682 bases long and contains 43 exons.

Common Aliases 
FHAD1 has 4 aliases, Forkhead associated phosphopeptide binding domain 1, Forkhead-associated (FHA) phosphopeptide binding domain 1, FHA Domain-Containing Protein 1, and KIAA1937.

mRNA 
The mRNA transcript of FHAD1 5138 bp long. The gene has 30 isoforms based on NCBI gene data.

Protein 
The FHAD 1 protein is 1412 aa long, weighs 16.2 kDa and has an isoelectric point of 6.52. It has 3 isoforms, namely 1, 3 and 4, but only isoform 1 is supported by experimental evidence. It consists of 1 glutamic acid rich region and 1 proline rich region.

Domains and Motifs

Forehead-associated domain 
The FHA domain extends from 18 - 84 aa in the protein. It can recognize and bind to phosphorylation sites, specifically pSer, pThr and pTyr. The exact mechanism and function of this domain still being studied, but it is found in proteins performing many different functions, mainly DNA repair and transduction.

Smc region 
FHAD1 contains one Smc (Structural maintenance of chromosomes) region from 275 - 1401 aa. This region encodes Smc proteins that are involved in cell cycle control, cell division and chromosome separation.

TMPIT-like protein, pfam07851 
This region extends from 394 - 494 aa in FHAD1. The proteins encoded by the TMPIT proteins are predicted to be transmembrane proteins. However, there is lack of literature to support this.

DUF342 
This domain extends from 694 - 777 aa in FHAD1. It encodes a protein from a family of bacterial proteins with no known function.

Structure 
FHAD1 contains the forkhead-associated domain that consists of beta sheets. Based on structure prediction softwares, the rest of the protein consists of alpha helices and random coils. Overall, FHAD1 has a coiled coil structure as shown in the figure.

Post-translational modifications 
FHAD1 is predicted to undergo multiple different types of post-translational modifications based on prediction softwares.

 Glycosylation: There were 101 possible glycosylation sites on FHAD1 and consisted mainly of amino acids involved in O-linked glycosyaltion. 
 Phosphorylation: The protein was predicted to have a large number of phosphorylation sites, at least more than 100. 
 Glycation: Multiple lysine residues of FHAD1 were predicted for glycation of their ε amino groups. 
 SUMOylation: 4 SUMOylation consensus sequences and 3 interaction sites were predicted on FHAD1. 
 O-GlcNAc sites: 6 sites for O-GlcNAc glycosylation were predicted on FHAD1. Research has shown that this specific type of glycosylation is most abundant in nucleocytoplasmic proteins.

Subcellular localization 
FHAD1 has been predicted to be a nuclear protein with 94.1% reliability. It also contains possible nuclear localization signal sequences between 1100 - 1107 aa. Two pat4 and one pat7 sequences were predicted. Pat4 and pat7 are consensus sequences consisting of clusters of lysine or arginine residues.

Expression 
In humans, FHAD1 is expressed in testis, fallopian tube and uterine tissues in females, nasopharynx and bronchi of lungs based on studies found on the Human Protein Atlas. NCBI's EST Profile also showed that FHAD1 is highly expressed in the testis, with some expression in the trachea and esophagus. In mice, the gene was also expressed in the testis, along with the pituitary gland, lung and brain.

Regulation of expression 
FHAD1 has a promoter that extends from 15246234 – 15247380 bp and is 1147 bp long. It includes an initial part of the 5' UTR of FHAD1. Some transcription factors predicted to bind to this promoter are:

 MAX binding protein - This protein is likely a transcriptional repressor from the E-box binding factors family
 TR4/TR2 - These proteins are part of a family of nuclear receptors and bind to DR1 (direct repeat) elements of promoters. They act as anchors to recruit other corepressors
 Kaiso - This transcriptional regulator is encoded by the ZBTB33 gene and is involved in response to DNA damage by interacting with p53
 LYL1-E12 - This transcriptional factor is a dimer of two proteins, LYL1 and E12, where E12 is an E-box binding protein. LYL1 is also involved in some leukemias and is a possible oncogenic factor. 
 Nur 77 - This protein is also known as NGFIB (Nerve growth factor IB) and belongs to a family of nuclear receptors. It is involved in apoptosis and cell growth pathways. 

In the 5' UTR and 3' UTR of FHAD1, multiple stem loops are predicted to form .

Function 
FHAD1 can be involved in transcriptional regulation through interaction with other transcriptional regulators.

Protein interactions 
FHAD1 was found to be a binding partner for GTF2IRD1 (GTF2I repeat domain containing protein 1) via a yeast 2 hybrid screen. GTF2I is a gene that encodes the general transcription factor II-1. This specific study showed that GTF2IRD1 is a nuclear protein that is involved transcriptional regulation through chromatin modification. The fact that it exists in the nucleus and was found in neuronal cells correlates with the localization and functional data for FHAD1. Additionally, FHAD1 and GTF2IRD1 interacted through RD2 (repeat domain 2) of GTF2IRD1. RD2 has shown some level of DNA binding activity. 

FHAD1 was found to interact (colocalization) with 14-3-3 protein epsilon via cosedimentation. This protein binds to a number of binding partners, mostly by recognizing phosphothreonine or phosphoserine motifs.

Clinical Significance 
FHAD1 showed differential expression in patients diagnosed with endometriosis and obesity.

Homology and Evolution 
FHAD1 has no known paralogs. It has orthologs in the organisms in the following classes: Mammalia, Reptilia, Aves, Sarcopterygii, Actinopterygii, Gastropoda and Lingulata. There was significant conservation in the FHA domain in all the organisms in the table below.

The rate of evolution of FHAD1 was compared with that of fibrinogen and cytochrome c and it showed that FHAD1 is a rapidly evolving gene.

References

Proteins
Genes on human chromosome 1